Faridah Nambi   is a Ugandan social worker, social activist and politician.

Background and education
Nambi  was born to Moses Kigongo in Butambala District.
Nambi received a Master of Business Administration from The University of Edinburgh.

Community work
She has participated in community development projects, including a clean water campaign, advocate for social issues and hosted a talk show. In April 2010, Nambi was among the participants who attended the presidential summit organised by Barack Obama in Washington.

Politics
In February 2020, Nambi formally announced her bid to run for Kampala Women Parliamentary Constituency in the 2021 general election.

References

External links

https://www.parliament.go.ug/cmis/browser?id=3fe62db4-571e-4a30-a025-9a45c5ec341b%3B1.0
https://smart24tv.co.ug/2020/03/11/hajat-faridah-nambi-empowers-women/

Living people
People from Butambala District
Makerere University alumni
Ugandan politicians
Year of birth missing (living people)
Alumni of the University of Edinburgh
People from Kampala District